Paisley shawls were a fashionable item of women's clothing in the 19th century made of intricately woven and delicate wool. Although known as the Paisley pattern, the teardrop motif originated in Persia and India, becoming popular in Europe—and synonymous with Paisley, Renfrewshire—in the 19th century.

History 

The Paisley shawl has its antecedents in the Kashmir shawl, produced in Kashmir since the 11th century and more intensively in central Asia in the 15th and 16th centuries.  In the 18th century, travel and trade saw them brought back to Europe.  Around 1808, the first shawls of this kind were being produced in Paisley, Scotland.  This began a 70-year period during which the town of Paisley, which had long been an important weaving town, became the most important centre of production for these kinds of shawls.  By 1850, there were over 7,000 weavers working in the town.

Shawls were also produced in Edinburgh, Glasgow, France, and Norwich, but Paisley's innovations in production methods (particularly, sub division of labour) meant that by 1850 Edinburgh halted production, not able to compete. 
The popularity of the Paisley shawls was increased by Queen Victoria's purchase of some in 1842. Their popularity declined in the 1870s, due partly to a reduction in price and increase in availability, and also to a change in women's fashion with the addition of the bustle. A decorative bustle was meant to be seen, and a shawl would cover it. It also meant that a shawl would no longer drape in the same manner. Shawls gave way to differently designed wraps, including mantles, capes, and dolmans. Another reason for their reduced popularity was connected with availability. The Franco-Prussian War (1870-1871) also prevented the export of shawls from Kashmir.

Production methods 
In 1812, weavers in Paisley were responsible for innovations in the hand-loom process, adding an attachment which increased the number of colours able to be used from two to five. Up until the 1820s, weaving was a cottage industry but the introduction of the Jacquard loom in 1820 meant that weaving moved into the factory. Between 1820 and 1850, the shawls would be woven by an individual weaver.  However, an explosion in demand meant that changes in production methods became necessary. The increasing commercialisation of production meant that highly skilled weavers might no longer use their creativity in designing patterns. Rather, weavers now had to follow patterns supplied to them, often on the complex Jacquard looms, rather than their own looms. This caused a reduction with wages, autonomy, and prestige.

The Paisley Museum shawl collection 

A collection of Paisley shawls is on display at the Paisley Museum and Art Galleries in Scotland, along with examples of original hand looms. The collection is a Recognised Collection of National Significance to Scotland.

References 

Paisley, Renfrewshire
Shawls and wraps
Textiles
Scottish design
Scottish fashion
Scottish clothing